The 2015 CAF Confederation Cup Final was the final of the 2015 CAF Confederation Cup, the 12th edition of the CAF Confederation Cup, Africa's secondary club football competition organized by the Confederation of African Football (CAF).

The final was contested in two-legged home-and-away format between Orlando Pirates of South Africa and Étoile du Sahel of Tunisia. The first leg was hosted by Orlando Pirates at the Orlando Stadium in Johannesburg on 21 November 2015, while the second leg was hosted by Étoile du Sahel at the Stade Olympique de Sousse in Sousse on 29 November 2015. The winner earned the right to play in the 2016 CAF Super Cup against the winner of the 2015 CAF Champions League.

After drawing the first leg 1–1, Étoile du Sahel won the second leg 1–0 on Ammar Jemal's goal, giving them the title on the 2–1 on aggregate.

Road to final

Note: In all results below, the score of the finalist is given first (H: home; A: away).

Rules
The final was played on a home-and-away two-legged basis, with the order of legs decided by a draw, held after the group stage draw. If the aggregate score was tied after the second leg, the away goals rule would be applied, and if still level, the penalty shoot-out would be used to determine the winner (no extra time would be played).

Matches

First leg

Second leg

References

External links
Orange Confederation Cup 2015, CAFonline.com

2015
Final
Orlando Pirates F.C. matches
Étoile Sportive du Sahel matches